Gjin Aleksi Mosque is a 15th-century mosque in the village of Rusan, near Delvinë, Albania. It is a Cultural Monument of Albania. The mosque is distinguished for the high quality of acoustics that is obtained through casks that are strategically placed in holes in the walls.

See also
 Islam in Albania

References

Cultural Monuments of Albania
Buildings and structures in Delvinë
Mosques in Vlorë County